Nanhe may refer to:

Nanhe Jaisalmer, 2007 film
Nanhe County (南和县), of Xingtai, Hebei, China
Towns (南河镇)
Nanhe, Gucheng County, Hubei, in Gucheng County, Hubei, China
Nanhe, Yingshan County, in Yingshan County, Huanggang, Hubei, China
Nanhe, Xiangshui County, in Xiangshui County, Jiangsu, China